Barney Ross (born Dov-Ber "Beryl" David Rosofsky; December 23, 1909 – January 17, 1967) was an American professional boxer. Ross became a world champion in three weight divisions and was a decorated veteran of World War II.

Early life
Dov-Ber (or Beryl) Rosofsky was born in New York City to Isidore "Itchik" Rosofsky and Sarah Epstein Rosofsky. His father was a Talmudic scholar who had emigrated to America from his native Brest-Litovsk after barely surviving a pogrom. The family then moved from New York to Chicago. Isidore became a rabbi and owner of a small vegetable shop in Chicago's Maxwell Street neighborhood, a vibrant Jewish ghetto akin to the New York's Lower East Side of the 1920s and '30s. Dov-Ber was being raised to follow in his footsteps.

The young Rasofsky grew up on Chicago's mean streets, ultimately ignoring his father's desire for him to become a rabbi and his admonition that Jews do not resort to violence. Let the goyim be the fighters, Ross later recalled being told by his father. The trombeniks, the murderers—we are the scholars. Ross's ambition in life was to become a Jewish teacher and a Talmudic scholar, but his life was changed forever when his father was shot dead resisting a robbery at his small grocery. Prostrate from grief, his mother Sarah suffered a nervous breakdown and his younger siblings—Ida, Sam and George—were placed in an orphanage or farmed out to other members of the extended family. Dov was left to his own devices at the age of 14.

As recounted in Barney Ross: The Life of a Jewish Fighter, by Ross biographer Douglas Century, in the wake of the tragedy, Dov became vindictive towards everything and turned his back on the orthodox religion of his father. He began running around with local toughs (including another wayward Jewish ghetto kid, the future Jack Ruby), developing into a street brawler, thief and money runner; he was even employed by Al Capone. Dov's goal was to earn enough money to buy a home so that he could reunite his family. He saw boxing as that vehicle and began training with his friend Ruby.

Boxing career

After winning amateur bouts, Dov would pawn the awards—like watches—and set the money aside for his family. There is speculation that Capone bought up tickets to his early fights, knowing some of that money would be funneled to Dov. Plagued by his father's death and feeling an obligation not to sully his name, Dov Rosofsky took the new name "Barney Ross." The name change was also part of a larger trend by Jews to assimilate in the U.S. by taking American-sounding names. Strong, fast and possessed of a powerful will, Ross was soon an Intercity Golden Gloves and Chicago Golden Gloves champion in 1929 at the age of 19 and went on to dominate the lighter divisions as a pro.

At a time—the late 1920s and '30s—when rising Nazi leader Adolf Hitler was using propaganda to spread his virulently anti-Jewish philosophy, Ross was seen by American Jews as one of their greatest advocates. He represented the concept of Jews finally fighting back. Idolized and respected by all Americans, Ross showed that Jews could thrive in their new country. He made his stand against Hitler and Nazi Germany a public one. He knew that by winning boxing matches, he was displaying a new kind of strength for Jews. He also understood that Americans loved their sports heroes and if Jews wanted to be embraced in the U.S. they would have to assume such places in society. Though Ross had lost faith in religion, he openly embraced his role as a leader of his people.

Ross is unique in boxing as one of its few triple division champions—lightweight, light welterweight and welterweight. He was never knocked out in 81 fights and held his title against some of the best competition in the history of the sport. Ross defeated great Hall-of-Fame champions like Jimmy McLarnin and Tony Canzoneri in epic battles that drew crowds of more than 50,000.

His first paid fight was on September 1, 1929, when he beat Ramon Lugo by a decision in six rounds. After ten wins in a row, he lost for the first time, to Carlos García, on a decision in ten.

Over the next 35 bouts, his record was 32–1–2, including a win over former world champion Battling Battalino and one over Babe Ruth (not the baseball player). Another bout included former world champion Cameron Welter. On March 26, 1933, Ross had his first world title bout when he faced world lightweight and light welterweight champion and fellow three-division world champion Tony Canzoneri in Chicago. In one night, Ross became a two-division world champion when he beat Canzoneri by decision in ten rounds. Ross also campaigned heavily in the city of Chicago prior to the fight. After two more wins, including a knockout in six rounds over Johnny Farr, Ross and Canzoneri boxed again, with Ross winning again by decision, but this time in 15.

Ross was known as a smart fighter with great stamina. He retained his title by decision against Sammy Fuller to finish 1933 and against Peter Nebo to begin 1934. Then he defended against former world champion Frankie Klick, against whom he drew in ten. Then came the first of three bouts versus Jimmy McLarnin. Ross vacated the light welterweight title to go after McLarnin's welterweight title and won by a 15-round decision, his third world championship. However, in a rematch a few weeks later, McLarnin beat Ross by a decision and recovered the title. After that, Ross went back down to light welterweight and reclaimed his title with a 12-round decision over Bobby Pacho. After beating Klick and Henry Woods by decision to retain that title, he went back up in weight for his third and last fight with McLarnin; he recovered the welterweight title by outpointing McLarnin again over 15 rounds. He won 16 bouts in a row after that, including three over future world middleweight champion Ceferino Garcia and one against Al Manfredo. His only two defenses, however, over that stretch were against Garcia and against Izzy Jannazzo, on points in 15 rounds.

In his last fight, Ross defended his title on May 31, 1938, against fellow three-division world champion Henry Armstrong, who beat him by a decision in 15. Although Armstrong pounded Ross inexorably and his trainers begged him to let them stop the fight, Ross refused to stop or go down. Barney Ross had never been knocked out in his career and was determined to leave the ring on his feet. Some boxing experts view Ross's performance against Armstrong as one of the most courageous in history. Some believe that Ross's will to survive every tough fight on his feet had to do with his understanding of his symbolic importance to Jews. That is, Jews would not only fight back, but they would not go down.

Ross retired with a record of 72 wins, 4 losses, 3 draws and two no decisions (Newspaper Decisions: 2–0–0), with 22 wins by knockout. He was ranked #21 on Ring Magazines list of the 80 Best Fighters of the Last 80 Years.

World War II
In retirement in his early thirties, Ross enlisted in the United States Marine Corps in April 1942 to fight in World War II. The Marines wanted to keep him stateside and use his celebrity status to boost morale. Most of the athletes of the era, like heavyweight champion Jack Dempsey, had ceremonial roles in the military, but Ross insisted on fighting for his country.

Before he was to go overseas, Ross physically assaulted a non-commissioned officer who had made an anti-Semitic remark. He was to be court martialed at the Marine Corps Recruit Depot, San Diego. The other board members wanted to throw the book at Ross, but Captain Berthol E. Davis, who was also Jewish and knew of Ross's achievements, convinced the rest of the board to allow Ross to go overseas and avoid punishment. So, he was sent to the Pacific theater.

He served with B Company, 1st Battalion, 8th Marines during the Battle of Guadalcanal in the South Pacific. One night, he and three other comrades were trapped under enemy fire. All four were wounded; Ross was the only one able to fight. Ross gathered his comrades' rifles and grenades and single-handedly fought nearly two dozen Japanese soldiers over an entire night, killing them all by morning. Two of the Marines died, but he carried the third on his shoulders to safety; the other man weighed 230 lb (104 kg) compared to Ross' 140 lb (64 kg).

Ross was awarded America's third highest military honor, the Silver Star, as well as a Presidential Citation. As one of America's greatest "celebrity" war heroes, he was honored by President Roosevelt in a Rose Garden ceremony. He was also awarded the Edward J. Neil Trophy as "the outstanding boxer of 1942" by the Boxing Writers Association of New York.

During his time in Guadalcanal, Ross began a lifelong friendship with the Catholic priest Frederic Gehring, a wartime chaplain who wrote regular correspondences for Reader's Digest magazine. Gehring considered Ross a national treasure who defied logic when it came to bravery and the defense of principle. Ross was the only person on Guadacanal capable of playing the temperamental pipe organ kept there. On Christmas Eve, before he and his fellow Marines were to go into battle, Gehring asked Ross to learn "Silent Night" and other Christmas songs for the troops. After Ross had played them, Gehring asked him to play a Jewish song. Ross played "My Yiddishe Momma," about a child's love for his self-sacrificing mother. Many of the Marines knew the melody of the song from Ross's boxing days, when it was played when he entered the ring. When the Marines heard Ross play the song, newspaper reports say, they were all in tears.

Drug addiction and recovery
During his recovery at the hospital from his wounds suffered at Guadalcanal, Ross developed a dependency on the morphine he was administered for pain. Back in the states, the morphine was replaced with street heroin. His drug habit became so severe that he would sometimes spend $500 a day on the drug. Ross went to a recovery center and overcame his addiction. He gave lectures to high school students about the dangers of drug addiction. His struggle against morphine addiction is the subject of the 1957 film Monkey on My Back.

Final days
Ross spent his last days using his celebrity status in promotional work for casinos and other businesses. He remained with his second wife, Cathy Howlett, although they never had children. He was happy he reached the two goals he had set: reunite his family and become a world champion in boxing. He wrote an autobiography titled No Man Stands Alone.

He also remained loyal to his friend Jack Ruby and testified as a character witness on Ruby's behalf at his trial for killing Lee Harvey Oswald, who was under arrest for the shooting death of Dallas patrolman, J.D. Tippit.

Ross died in his hometown Chicago of throat cancer at the age of 57.

His relatives include Yuri Rasovsky, Solomon Rosowsky and Baruch Leib Rosowsky.

Honors
Ross was inducted into the International Boxing Hall of Fame, the World Boxing Hall of Fame, the Chicagoland Sports Hall of Fame, the International Jewish Sports Hall of Fame and the National Jewish Sports Hall of Fame in 1997. He was inducted into the Marine Corps Sports Hall of Fame in the Class of 2006.

The Aleph Zadik Aleph chapter located in Chicago's south suburbs (primarily in Flossmoor, Homewood, and Olympia Fields), is named in his honor.

Professional boxing record
All information in this section is derived from BoxRec, unless otherwise stated.

Official record

All newspaper decisions are officially regarded as “no decision” bouts and are not counted in the win/loss/draw column.

Unofficial record

Record with the inclusion of newspaper decisions in the win/loss/draw column.

See also
Lineal championship
List of lightweight boxing champions
List of light welterweight boxing champions
List of select Jewish boxers

References

Further reading

Sussman, Jeffrey. 2016. Max Baer and Barney Ross: Jewish Heroes of Boxing. Lanham, MD: Rowman & Littlefield.
Interview with Ross biography Barney Ross author Douglas Century on Eight Forty-Eight radio program, WBEZ public radio; Chicago, Illinois; March 9, 2006. MP3 file available for free download.

External links

|-

|-

|-

|-

|-

|-

|-

bio article, Jewish Virtual Library
NY post, book opinion
John Burke, "Triple titleholder tells how he won toughest fight", New Orleans Times-Picayune, August 13, 2006, p. D2.
Barney Ross Biography at J-Grit J-Grit: The Internet Index of Tough Jews
https://fieretlibre.com/2019/03/26/barney-ross-boxeur-juif-et-heros-de-guerre/
 https://boxrec.com/media/index.php/National_Boxing_Association%27s_Quarterly_Ratings:_1933
 https://boxrec.com/media/index.php/National_Boxing_Association%27s_Quarterly_Ratings:_1935
 https://boxrec.com/media/index.php/National_Boxing_Association%27s_Quarterly_Ratings:_1936
 https://boxrec.com/media/index.php/National_Boxing_Association%27s_Quarterly_Ratings:_1937
 https://boxrec.com/media/index.php/National_Boxing_Association%27s_Quarterly_Ratings:_1938
https://titlehistories.com/boxing/na/usa/ny/nysac-l.html
 https://titlehistories.com/boxing/na/usa/ny/nysac-wl.html

1909 births
1967 deaths
American male boxers
United States Marine Corps personnel of World War II
American people of Belarusian-Jewish descent
Boxers from Chicago
Deaths from cancer in Illinois
Deaths from cancer
International Boxing Hall of Fame inductees
Jewish American boxers
Jewish boxers
Jewish American military personnel
Recipients of the Silver Star
United States Marines
Welterweight boxers
World lightweight boxing champions
World light-welterweight boxing champions
World boxing champions
Boxers from New York City
20th-century American Jews
Military personnel from Chicago